Samantha Purvis (born 24 June 1967) is a retired British swimmer.

Career
Purvis competed at the 1984 Summer Olympics and the 1992 Summer Olympics. She represented England and won a bronze medal in the 100 metres butterfly, at the 1986 Commonwealth Games in Edinburgh, Scotland. Four years later she represented England in the butterfly and medley events, at the 1990 Commonwealth Games in Auckland, New Zealand. She also won the ASA National Championship title in the 100 metres butterfly three times (1984, 1985, 1987)  and the 200 metres butterfly three times (1984, 1985, 1989).

References

External links
 

1967 births
Living people
British female swimmers
Olympic swimmers of Great Britain
Swimmers at the 1984 Summer Olympics
Swimmers at the 1992 Summer Olympics
Sportspeople from Sunderland
Commonwealth Games medallists in swimming
Commonwealth Games bronze medallists for England
Swimmers at the 1986 Commonwealth Games
Swimmers at the 1990 Commonwealth Games
20th-century British women
Medallists at the 1986 Commonwealth Games